Deborah Ager is an American poet, essayist, and editor.

Life
Deborah Ager founded the poetry magazine known as 32 poems or 32 Poems Magazine in 2003 with the poet John Poch. She was educated at the University of Maryland (B.A.) and the University of Florida (M.F.A.).

She has published three books. She co-edited the anthologies Old Flame: 10 Years of 32 Poems Magazine (2012) with John Poch and Bill Beverly and The Bloomsbury Anthology of Contemporary Jewish American Poetry (2013) with M. E. Silverman.

Her writing has appeared in New England Review, The Georgia Review, Birmingham Poetry Review, Los Angeles Review, North American Review, and Best New Poets 2006. She has received fellowships and/or scholarships from the MacDowell Colony, the Virginia Center for the Creative Arts, the Atlantic Center for the Arts, and the Mid Atlantic Arts Foundation. She was a Walter E. Dakin fellow at the Sewanee Writers' Conference as well as a Tennessee Williams Scholar.

Her manuscript Midnight Voices was a semifinalist for the A. Poulin, Jr. Poetry Prize in 2007 before being accepted for publication by Cherry Grove Collections.

She serves on the advisory boards for A.I.R. Studio Paducah and Midmountain arts residencies. In the past, she served on the board of 32 poems magazine and on the editorial board of Redux Magazine. Ager is a former co-director of the Joaquin Miller Cabin poetry reading series in Washington, DC, which used to take place in Rock Creek Park.

Ager is also an essayist, with nonfiction writing published in Narratively, The Week, and Modern Loss.

Honors and awards
Scholarship, West Chester Poetry Conference, 2011
Fellowship, Virginia Center for the Creative Arts
Walter E. Dakin Fellowship, Sewanee Writers’ Conference
Fellowship, Mid Atlantic Arts Foundation, 2009
Tennessee Williams scholar, Sewanee Writers' Conference
Fellowship, MacDowell Colony

Books

Works 
"The Lights and Lessons of Toro Nagashi, the Japanese Candle Boat Ceremony," Modern Loss, 2018.
"10 Free Meditations to Encourage Restful Sleep," The Greatist, 2018.
From the Fishouse, May 2011
"The Problem With Describing Men"
"Mangos", Delaware Poetry Review, March 2003
"The Lake", Connecticut Review, 2002
"Night in Iowa", Georgia Review, 2000
"Night: San Francisco", New England Review, 2002
"Santa Fe In Winter", New England Review, 2002
"The Space Coast", American Literary Review, 2002

Personal life
Ager is married to the writer Bill Beverly.

References

External links 
 
Short biography
Interview from the We Who Are About to Die blog
Poet of the Month Feature
Selection of Published Poems
Blog

1978 births
Living people
American women poets
University of Maryland, College Park alumni
University of Florida alumni
21st-century American poets
People from Bethesda, Maryland
Poets from Maryland
21st-century American women writers